Indian Institute of Information Technology, Sri City is an educational institute of national importance located in Sri City, Tirupati district, Andhra Pradesh, India set up by the Ministry of Human Resource Development, Government of India, under the partnership with Andhra Pradesh Government and Sri City consortium. The institute is run by the Board of Governors of the IIIT Society. The Board of Governors include representatives of MHRD, GoAP, and Industry Partners as well as eminent people from academia, industry, and civil society.

It was heavily criticised for the quality of education that it provides

History
The Indian Institute of Information Technology Sricity started its first batch in 2013 with IIIT Hyderabad as the mentor institute.

Location
Much of Sri City area is in Tirupati district. The Satish Dhawan Space Centre (SHAR), India's satellite/rocket launching center is located at Sriharikota, on the eastern side of Pulicat Lake which separates Sri City and the satellite launching station.

Academic programs
The institute presently offers B.Tech in Computer Science and Engineering (CSE), B.Tech in Electronics and Communication Engineering (ECE), PhD in ECE and CSE. Its MS by Research program was suspended in 2019 due to its unpopularity.

Admissions
The admission to IIIT is through Central Seat allocation Board (CSAB). The students are allotted admission by CSAB based on their Joint Entrance Examination (JEE-Main) ranks. The Indian Institute of Information Technology, Sri City, Tirupati district, Andhra Pradesh is listed in the CSAB website under List of participating institutes in Other Central Government / State Government Funded Technical Institutes.

References

External links
 

Tirupati district
Sri City
2013 establishments in Andhra Pradesh
Educational institutions established in 2013
Buildings and structures in Tirupati district